Lee Chang-dong (Hanja: 李滄東; born July 4, 1954) is a South Korean film director, screenwriter, and novelist. He has directed six feature films: Green Fish (1997), Peppermint Candy (2000), Oasis (2002), Secret Sunshine (2007), Poetry (2010), and Burning (2018). Burning became the first Korean film to make it to the 91st Academy Awards' final nine-film shortlist for Best Foreign Language Film. Burning also won the Fipresci International Critics' Prize at the 71st Cannes Film Festival, Best Foreign Language Film in Los Angeles Film Critics Association, and Best Foreign Language Film in Toronto Film Critics Association.

Lee has won Silver Lion for Best Director and Fipresci International Critics' Prize at the 2002 Venice Film Festival and the Best Screenplay Award at the 2010 Cannes Film Festival. He also won the award for Achievement in Directing at the 4th Asia Pacific Screen Awards in 2017, Jury Grand Prize at the 2018 Asia Pacific Screen Awards, Best Director and Lifetime Achievement Award at the 13th Asian Film Awards in 2019, and he has been nominated for the Golden Lion and the Palme d'Or. Lee served as South Korea's Minister of Culture and Tourism from 2003 to 2004.

Early life
Lee Chang-dong was born in Daegu, Korea. He graduated in 1981 with a degree in Korean Literature from Kyungpook National University in Daegu, where he spent much of his time in the theater, writing and directing plays. He went on to teach high school Korean and established himself as a novelist with his first novel Chonri in 1983.

Career 
Lee had no formal training in filmmaking. He was approached by Park Kwang-su to write the screenplay for To the Starry Island. Lee negotiated for an assistant director (AD) position as part of the deal and was promoted to first AD on the first day of the shoot when the original first AD failed to show up. The film was released in 1993. He went on to write A Single Spark in 1995, which won Best Film at the 1995 Blue Dragon Film Awards.

After being encouraged by his contemporaries to finally step behind the director's chair, Lee made Green Fish, a "critique of Korean society told through the eyes of a young man who becomes enmeshed in the criminal underworld", in 1997. Green Fish won Best Film at Blue Dragon Film Awards, Dragons and Tigers Award at the Vancouver International Film Festival, and had NETPAC Award's Special Mention at Rotterdam International Film Festival.
	
In 2000, Lee made Peppermint Candy, a story following a single man in reverse chronology through 20 years of South Korean history—from 1980's student uprising, to the film's 2000 release. Peppermint Candy won Special Jury Prize at Bratislava International Film Festival, and got three awards at Karlovy Vary International Film Festival including Don Quijote Award, Special Jury Prize and NETPAC Award. The film also won Best Film at Grand Bell Awards.

Lee released Oasis in 2002, a story involving a mentally ill man and a woman with cerebral palsy, winning the Silver Lion for Best Director at the 2003 Venice Film Festival. Oasis was selected as Korean entry for the Best Foreign Language Film at the 75th Academy Awards. The film was awarded Chief Dan George Humanitarian Award at 2003 Vancouver International Film Festival. It also won 2003 Venice International Film Festival's Special Director's Award, FIPRESCI Prize, and SIGNIS Award. Lee won Baeksang Arts Awards for Best Director. Oasis was nominated at the 2005 Independent Spirit Awards for Best Foreign Film.

From 2003 to 2004, Lee served as the minister of Culture and Tourism in the South Korean Government. On the political appointment, Lee said:

In October 2006, Lee was awarded with the Chevalier (Knight) order of the Legion d'Honneur (Legion of Honor) by the French government for "his contribution to maintaining the screen quota to promote cultural diversity as a cultural minister." It was delivered to the French embassy in South Korea by the French Minister of Culture, Renaud Donnedieu de Vabres during an official visit.

Lee's fourth film, Secret Sunshine about a grieving mother who loses her son, was completed in 2007. At the 60th Cannes Film Festival, the film was entered in the competition category with lead actress Jeon Do-yeon, winning the Prix d'interprétation féminine. It was released to theaters in South Korea in 2007, and was South Korea's submission for the Academy Awards for Best Foreign Language Film in 2008. Secret Sunshine won Best Feature Film at Asia Pacific Screen Awards. It won Best Film and Best Director at 2008 Asian Film Awards. It won Best Picture and Best Director at Korean Film Awards, Best Director at Director's Cut Awards, and Special Award at Grand Bell Awards.

In 2009, Lee was appointed as a jury member of the international competition in 61st Cannes Film Festival along with Isabelle Huppert, Shu Qi and Robin Wright Penn.

The following year, Lee's film Poetry was released. The film tells a story of a suburban woman in her 60s who begins to develop an interest in poetry while struggling with Alzheimer's disease and her irresponsible grandson. It garnered positive critical reviews and won the Best Screenplay Award at the 2010 Cannes Film Festival. Notably, the film's starring role was played by Yoon Jeong-hee, who was returning to the screen after an absence of 16 years. For this film, Lee won Achievement in Directing in Asia Pacific Screen Awards. Poetry also won Best Film and Best Screenplay at 2010 Grand Bell Awards, and Lee won Best Director at 2011 Baeksang Arts Awards.

Lee returned after eight years of hiatus with a 2018 psychological drama mystery film Burning, based on one of Haruki Murakami's seventeen short stories in The Elephant Vanishes, "Barn Burning". The film premiered at the 71st Cannes Film Festival, winning the Fipresci International Critics' Prize. It became the highest-rated film in the history of Screen International’s Cannes jury grid. Burning was selected as the South Korean entry for the Best Foreign Language Film at the 91st Academy Awards, and became the first Korean film to make it to the final nine-film shortlist of the Academy Awards for Best Foreign Language Film. Burning also won Best Foreign Language Film in Los Angeles Film Critics Association, Best Foreign Language Film in Toronto Film Critics Association, and the runner-up of National Board of Review's Top Five Foreign Language Film. It was included on RogerEbert.com's Great Movies. For this film, Lee won Best Director at 2018 Buil Film Awards and 2019 KOFRA Film Awards. In addition to international acclaims, the film also won 2018 Grand Bell Awards for Best Film and FIPRESCI Award at Korean Association of Film Critics Awards.

In March 2019, Lee won Best Director for Burning and was honored Lifetime Achievement Award at the 13th Asian Film Awards. In 2021, he was appointed as the head of jury of the international competition in the 15th Asian Film Awards.

Political beliefs
Lee Chang-dong was born in Daegu, the most conservative and rightist city in Korea, to lower middle class parents, who were left-leaning, particularly his father. His family came from noble class of the old Korea. This contradiction of growing up in an ex-noble family with socialist ties shaped his character, and subsequently his film style.

Lee supported Roh Moo-hyun's candidacy since 2002, and after he won the elections, Lee served in the office as Minister of Culture from 2003 to 2004. During his term, Lee proposed a screen quota for independent film but his proposal met with fierce opposition by the Korean movie industry. However, in October 2006, he was rewarded for his efforts with the Chevalier (Knight) order of the Legion d'Honneur (Legion of Honor) by the French government for "his contribution to maintaining the screen quota to promote cultural diversity as a cultural minister".

Lee has been boycotting and refusing to attend the Blue Dragon Film Awards ceremony since 2002 due to political conflicts with Chosun Ilbo, a conservative South Korean newspaper which hosts the awards. Consequently, since 2002 his films have never been submitted to the competition and were excluded from the nomination for the award’s best picture and best director.

For nearly a decade until 2017, during the Lee Myung-bak and Park Geun-hye presidential administrations, Lee Chang-dong was blacklisted by the government. Artists such as Lee that were put on the blacklist were subject to investigations and denial of subsidies. Lee recalls of his eight-year-hiatus:

Film and directing style

Lee Chang-dong describes his creative process as one of utter despair. Almost all Lee's films have that of melodramatic element, except for Burning that bends the contours of the thriller with a tense, haunting multiple-character study. All his films are dark stories of innocence lost, suffering and alienation. His key themes have been consistently about psychological trauma. Rather than allowing his characters simply to wallow in their misery, Lee draws them into situations that make them search, often futilely, for the meaning of life. Memory has often been an important theme for Lee. His work can be defined by the tragedy genre and his stories almost always involve his characters experiencing some degree of suffering.

His films are the reflection of the repressive social and political climate of the South Korea, and depictions of marginalized blue-collar Koreans. His characters are characteristically anti-heroic, but he seems to justify them due to their background. Through realistic portraits of troubled characters, Lee asks the audience to examine themselves and to look at what society pushes under the rug. However, he shys away from masking his themes with bold surrealism. Instead, he's more driven by naturalism.

Lee doesn't give too specific direction when he works with actors. He believes that an actor’s reaction is more important than the action. He doesn't have a particular method of directing. He doesn't tell the actors to act or be in a certain way. Instead, he tells them to become the persona, the character in the film. He said, "What I try to have them do is become the character, to feel like the character. I do not try to be very specific in how I direct my actors, for instance I will not say things like 'Use this expression' or 'Speak this way', or 'Can you please raise the pitch of your voice a bit higher' or anything like that." And, "Sometimes, actors expect from me a bit more detail, to give them specific advise but I don't do that. But what I DO sometimes is to tell them different stories, or speak about other things that do not seem to have anything in common with what the actors should be playing, but indirectly might help them feel the same way as the character feels so that they become the character."

In respond to the pressures felt by Moon So-ri and Sol Kyung-gu on his film set, Lee said, "[...] I've never raised my voice, and I'm never really about giving any sort of strict direction, especially when it comes to working with the actors. When it comes to acting, I really prefer the actors to find themselves in the character, and find themselves living in the situations, themselves. I'm not someone to tell them, or to instruct them how to express whatever in a certain sort of situation." And, "[...] One of the things that I say a lot to my actors is, 'Don't act'. That be a bit flabbergasting to actors, because, 'Wait, I'm an actor, I'm supposed to act. What do you mean? What does that mean?' That can come as a confusing statement."

Literature
In 1987, Lee Chang-dong published his first short story, Possession, followed by There's a Lot of Shit in Nokcheon in 1992 which won him The Korea Times Literary Prize, and then Tenaciousness in 1996.

In 2007, Lee's short story, The Dreaming Beast (translated by Heinz Insu Fenkl), was published in the journal AZALEA. In 2018, his short story, On Destiny (translated by Soyoung Kim), was published in the journal Asymptote.

In 2023, Lee's short story, Snowy Day (translated by Heinz Insu Fenkl and Yoosup Chang), was published in March 6th issue of THE NEW YORKER.

Lee said about his writing style, "I always wrote for one person, for this person who thought and felt the same way as I do. It almost felt like I was writing a love letter to this very specific person who would understand what I'm writing and share the same feelings and thoughts."

Personal life
Lee Chang-dong is the third son out of four brothers. He said that they were very close, and called themselves fraternity brothers. His youngest brother, Lee Joon-dong, is a film producer for Lee's films. Lee hoped to become a painter growing up, but he could not afford art supplies. Lee and the president of MBC television and radio network company, Choi Seung-ho, are old friends and Kyungpook National University alumni. He personally asked Choi to appear in Burning playing as Jong-su's father. He is also a close friend of his frequent collaborator, actor Moon Sung-keun.

Filmography

Honors
 Order of Cultural Merit - Bogwan (Precious Crown), 3rd Class in 2002
 Legion d'Honneur - Jacques Chirac Administration in 2006

International awards

Local awards

References

External links
Nomination for the Gucci Group Award to be presented on September 3, 2007 at Venice's Palazzo Grassi during the 64th Venice Film Festival.
Lee Chang Dong Retrospective Singapore 2011
"On the Narratography of Lee Chang-dong: A Long Translator's Note" by Heinz Insu Fenkl

1954 births
Living people
People from Daegu
South Korean film directors
South Korean screenwriters
Recipients of the Legion of Honour
Venice Best Director Silver Lion winners
Best Director Asian Film Award winners
Kyungpook National University alumni
Cannes Film Festival Award for Best Screenplay winners
Culture ministers of South Korea
Tourism ministers of South Korea
Asia Pacific Screen Award winners
Academic staff of Korea National University of Arts
Best Director Paeksang Arts Award (film) winners